Elections to Fermanagh District Council were held on 18 May 1977 on the same day as the other Northern Irish local government elections. The election used five district electoral areas to elect a total of 20 councillors.

Election results

Note: "Votes" are the first preference votes.

Districts summary

|- class="unsortable" align="centre"
!rowspan=2 align="left"|Ward
! % 
!Cllrs
! % 
!Cllrs
! %
!Cllrs
! %
!Cllrs
! %
!Cllrs
!rowspan=2|TotalCllrs
|- class="unsortable" align="center"
!colspan=2 bgcolor="" | SDLP
!colspan=2 bgcolor="" | UUP
!colspan=2 bgcolor="" | UUUP
!colspan=2 bgcolor="" | Unity
!colspan=2 bgcolor="white"| Others
|-
|align="left"|Area A
|23.3
|1
|bgcolor="40BFF5"|30.3
|bgcolor="40BFF5"|1
|0.0
|0
|27.5
|1
|18.9
|1
|4
|-
|align="left"|Area B
|17.7
|1
|bgcolor="40BFF5"|43.9
|bgcolor="40BFF5"|2
|19.9
|1
|16.4
|0
|2.1
|0
|4
|-
|align="left"|Area C
|15.8
|1
|22.0
|1
|14.6
|0
|bgcolor=olive|28.5
|bgcolor=olive|1
|19.1
|1
|4
|-
|align="left"|Area D
|bgcolor="#99FF66"|37.8
|bgcolor="#99FF66"|2
|29.5
|1
|22.4
|1
|4.9
|0
|5.4
|0
|4
|-
|align="left"|Area E
|bgcolor="#99FF66"|31.0
|bgcolor="#99FF66"|2
|24.9
|1
|16.8
|1
|12.1
|0
|15.2
|0
|5
|- class="unsortable" class="sortbottom" style="background:#C9C9C9"
|align="left"| Total
|25.1
|7
|30.0
|6
|14.4
|3
|18.1
|2
|12.4
|2
|20
|-
|}

Districts results

Area A

1973: 2 x Unity, 1 x Independent Unionist, 1 x Independent Nationalist
1977: 1 x Unity, 1 x UUP, 1 x SDLP, 1 x Independent
1973-1977 Change: Independent gain from Unity, Independent Unionist joins UUP and Independent Nationalist joins SDLP

Area B

1973: 3 x UUP, 1 x Unity
1977: 2 x UUP, 1 x UUUP, 1 x SDLP
1973-1977 Change: UUUP and SDLP gain from UUP and Unity

Area C

1973: 2 x UUP, 1 x Unity, 1 x Independent Nationalist
1977: 1 x UUP, 1 x Unity, 1 x SDLP, 1 x Independent Nationalist
1973-1977 Change: SDLP gain from UUP

Area D

1973: 2 x SDLP, 2 x UUP
1977: 2 x SDLP, 1 x UUP, 1 x UUUP
1973-1977 Change: UUUP gain from UUP

Area E

1973: 2 x SDLP, 1 x UUP, 1 x Independent Unionist
1977: 2 x SDLP, 1 x UUP, 1 x UUUP
1973-1977 Change: UUUP gain from Independent Unionist

References

1977 Northern Ireland local elections
20th century in County Fermanagh
Fermanagh District Council elections